The Red Masque is an avant-garde rock band from Philadelphia, Pennsylvania.

Biography 

The Red Masque was founded by vocalist Lynnette Shelley and bassist Brandon Ross in February 2001, incorporating elements of psychedelia, heavy rock, rock-in-opposition, zeuhl, gothic, and kraut rock. One of the group's first concerts was at the Prelude to the 2001 North East Art Rock Festival (NEARFest); other notable shows have included the 2005 The Rogue Independent Music Festival in Atlanta, the 2001 WorldCon Science Fiction Convention, and the NJ Proghouse concert series.

The Red Masque has opened for notable performers and musicians such as Chris Cutler (Henry Cow, Art Bears), The Muffins, Sleepytime Gorilla Museum, Present, Martin Bisi and Julie Slick. In 2006, Dave Kerman (of Present, 5uus, Thinking Plague, etc.) and Paul Sears (of The Muffins and Thee Maximalists) performed with the band on stage as guest drummers/percussionists at the NJ Proghouse.

The Red Masque has released one EP ("Death of the Red Masque" in 2001), and four albums ("Victoria and the Haruspex" in 2002, "Feathers for Flesh" in 2004, "Fossil Eyes" in 2008, "Stars Fall On Me" in 2009). "Feathers for Flesh" was released through Big Balloon Music, and has been favorably reviewed in such publications as The Wire (issue no. 248) and Harmonie Magazine (issue no. 52). "Fossil Eyes" and "Stars Fall On Me" were both released through ReR USA, while "Mythalogue" was released through Beta-lactam Ring Records. Their forthcoming album, "Fathomless", will be self-released.

Shelley has performed on other progressive/space rock-oriented albums as a guest vocalist, including Magus (on the album "the Garden"), Church of Hed (space rock project by Quarkspace founder Paul Williams; Shelley performs on their debut album under the moniker "Sister Mary Haruspex"), and Ethereal (on the album "Beyond Neptune"; Ethereal is a solo project by former Alien Planetscapes member Richard Orlando).  In June 2007, Shelley performed as a guest vocalist with Bob Drake during his set at NEARfest. Shelley is also the lead vocalist in art rock band Green Cathedral, who released their debut album, "Winter's Veil", in late 2017. She is also a professional visual artist.

Ross has composed two soundtrack pieces for the website of Karl Welz, inventor of Orgonite and Orgone Radionics.

Members 
 Lynnette Shelley - vocals, percussion
 Brandon Ross - bass, keyboards
 Jim Harris - drums
 Scott Weingarten - guitar

Former Members 
 David Carle - guitar
 James Tunnicliffe - violin
 Glenn Kuchenbeiser - guitar
 Nicholas Giannetti - guitar
 Steve Craig - drums
 Brian "Vonorn" Van Korn - drums, keyboards, theremin
 Andrew Kowal - guitar, mandolin, violin
 Kevin Kelly - drums
 Steven Blumberg  - guitars
 Nathan-Andrew Dewin - keyboards, concert harp, percussion
 Kiarash Emami - guitar, mandolin.

Discography 
 Death of the Red Masque EP (2001)
 Victoria and the Haruspex (2002)
 Feathers for Flesh (2004)
 Fossil Eyes (2008)
 Stars Fall On Me (live album) (2009)
 Mythalogue (2013)
 Live at the Kennett Flash (live album) (2018)
 Fathomless (2018)

References

External links 
 
 The Red Masque's Bandcamp page
 Lynnette Shelley's art website
 Green Cathedral - Original art rock band featuring Lynnette Shelley on vocals

Musical groups from Philadelphia
Progressive rock musical groups from Pennsylvania